Woozy was an American experimental rock band from New Orleans.

Career
Woozy was formed in 2012. In 2013, the band released a split album with the dreamgaze band Dogtooth titled Somebody Else's Problem. In September 2014, Woozy appeared on a split with Ex-Breathers, Ovlov and Gnarwhal. In October 2015, Woozy released their first full-length album titled Blistered.

In June 2016, allegations of sexual assault against Woozy member John St. Cyr were made public by Katryn Macko of the Florida band Naps. As a result, Woozy's other members Kara and Ian stated in a Facebook post that Woozy is no longer a band anymore.

Band members
Kara Stafford (vocals, guitar)
John St. Cyr (vocals, guitar)
Ian Paine-Jesam (drums)

Discography
Studio albums
Blistered (2015, Exploding In Sound Records, Community Records)
Splits
Somebody Else's Problem (2013)
Woozy/Ex-Breathers/Gnarwhal/Ovlov (2014)

References

American experimental rock groups
Musical groups from New Orleans
Musical groups established in 2011
2011 establishments in Louisiana